Freeman Harlow Morse (February 18, 1807 – February 5, 1891) was a United States representative from Maine.

Early life and education
He was born in Bath, Massachusetts (now in Maine) on February 18, 1807.  He attended private schools and the academy in Bath.  He engaged in business as a carver of figureheads for ships.

Early political career
Morse was elected a member of the Maine House of Representatives. He was elected as a Whig to the Twenty-eighth Congress (March 4, 1843 – March 3, 1845). Morse was elected Mayor of Bath, Maine.

Congressional career
Morse was elected as a Republican to the Thirty-fifth and Thirty-sixth Congresses (March 4, 1857 – March 3, 1861).  Morse was Chairman of the Committee on Naval Affairs (Thirty-sixth Congress). He was not a candidate for renomination.

Diplomatic career
Morse was a delegate to the Peace Convention held in Washington, D.C. in 1861, in an effort to devise means to prevent the impending war. He was appointed by President Abraham Lincoln as United States consul in London March 22, 1861, and Consul General April 16, 1869. He resided in England after his retirement from office.

Death and burial
Morse died in Surbiton, Surrey, England, U.K. on February 5, 1891. His interment was in the parish churchyard of St. Mary’s in Long Ditton, England.

External links
Information incorporated from the public domain Bioguide of the US Congress
 

1807 births
1891 deaths
People from Bath, Maine
Businesspeople from Maine
Maine Whigs
Whig Party members of the United States House of Representatives
Republican Party members of the United States House of Representatives from Maine
19th-century American politicians
19th-century American businesspeople